"La Loi de Murphy" is the debut single by Belgian singer Angèle released on 23 October 2017. This song was later included on her debut album Brol.

Background
"La Loi de Murphy" was written by Angèle with Belgian rapper Veence Hanao and Matthew Irons, the singer and guitarist of Belgian group Puggy. The title means "Murphy's law" in French.

Music video
The music video for "La Loi de Murphy" was directed by Belgian photographer and filmmaker Charlotte Abramow. It was watched 460,000 times on YouTube three days after its release.

Charts

Weekly charts

Year-end charts

Certifications

References

2017 debut singles
Angèle (singer) songs